The Duke of York Column is a monument in London, England, to Prince Frederick, Duke of York, the second eldest son of King George III. The designer was Benjamin Dean Wyatt. It is sited where Regent Street meets The Mall, a purposefully wide endpoint of Regent Street known as Waterloo Place and Gardens, in between the two terraces of Carlton House Terrace and their tree-lined squares.  The three very wide flights of steps down to The Mall adjoining are known as the Duke of York Steps. The column was completed in December 1832 and the statue of the Duke of York, by Sir Richard Westmacott, was raised on 10 April 1834.

History

Prince Frederick, Duke of York and Albany was the commander-in-chief of the British Army during the French Revolutionary Wars and led the reform of the army into a capable modernised force. The Duke is remembered in the children's nursery rhyme, "The Grand Old Duke of York". When he died in 1827, the entire British Army by general consensus following a proposal of the senior officers, forwent one day's wages to pay for a monument to the Duke.

When the sum of subscriptions for a monument to the duke reached £21,000, the committee overseeing the project asked a number of architects to submit proposals, and in December 1830 they chose a design by Benjamin Dean Wyatt. The mason Nowell of Pimlico, was contracted to build the column for a sum of £15,760. Excavations for the concrete foundations began on 27 April 1831. The foundations were completed on 25 June 1831, and construction of the stonework  began three weeks later.

On 7 May 1850, Henri Joseph Stephan, a horn player in Benjamin Lumley's orchestra at Her Majesty's Theatre, committed suicide by falling from the public gallery at the top of the column.

Description
The column is of the Tuscan order. It is built of  granite from Aberdeenshire; a light grey variety was used for the pedestal, a bluer grey type for the base of the shaft, and 'red' Peterhead granite (warm beige) for the rest of the structure. There is an iron railing around the abacus of the capital (narrow main shaft). On top of the column, on a plinth, is a bronze statue of the duke dressed in the robes of the Knights of the Garter, by Sir Richard Westmacott.

The statue faces south southeast, and from its base also are views of The Mall and St. James's Park.

Inside the hollow column a spiral staircase of 168 steps, lit by narrow apertures in the wall, leads to the viewing platform around the base of the statue. Given the small, fragile platform and previous high demand for climbing, this staircase has been closed to the public for many decades.

The great height of the column caused contemporary wits to suggest that the Duke was trying to escape his creditors, as the Duke died £2 million in debt.

The high very wide central section t-road it sits in was designed by architect John Nash as London's  in the 1815–1820 period.  Wealthy nobles desirous of a central London home followed by politicians such as William Ewart Gladstone lived in its Grade I-listed terraces described as 'palatial' by Historic England.

References

Bibliography
 "Prince Frederick, Duke of York and Albany", The Mechanic's Magazine, Museum, Register, Journal and Gazette, Vol. 574, 9 August 1834, pp. 306–311 – a contemporary report on the building of the monument.

External links
 

Monuments and memorials in London
Monumental columns in London
Grade I listed buildings in the City of Westminster
Grade I listed monuments and memorials
Cultural infrastructure completed in 1834
Tourist attractions in the City of Westminster
Statues in England
Buildings and structures on The Mall, London
Sculptures by Richard Westmacott